The Zen tradition is maintained and transferred by a high degree of institutionalisation, despite the emphasis on individual experience and the iconoclastic picture of Zen.

In Japan, modernity has led to criticism of the formal system and the commencement of lay-oriented Zen-schools such as the Sanbo Kyodan and the Ningen Zen Kyodan. How to organize the continuity of the Zen-tradition in the west, constraining charismatic authority and the derailment it may bring on the one hand, and maintaining the legitimacy and authority by limiting the number of authorized teachers on the other hand, is a challenge for the developing Zen-communities in the west.

Temple-training

Since the East Mountain Teaching, Zen has centered on monastic life. In modern Soto and Rinzai, monasteries serve as training facilities to educate Zen priests, most of whom move on to run their own temple. Japanese laity has been allowed to participate in Zen training only since the Meiji Restoration.

Japanese Soto and Rinzai are organized in a system of head-temples and sub-temples.

Soto
Contemporary Soto-shu has four classes of temples:
 , head temples, namely Eihei-ji and Sōji-ji;
 Kakuchi, teaching monasteries, where at least once a year an ango (ninety-day retreat) takes place;
 Hōchi, dharma temples;
 Jun hōchi, ordinary temples.

While Eihei-ji owes its existence to Dōgen, throughout history this head temple has had significantly fewer sub-temple affiliates than the Sōji-ji. During the Tokugawa period, Eiheiji had approximately 1,300 affiliate temples compared to Sōji-ji's 16,200. Furthermore, out of the more than 14,000 temples of the Sōtō sect today, 13,850 of those identify themselves as affiliates of Sōji-ji. Additionally, most of the some 148 temples that are affiliates of Eiheiji today are only minor temples located in Hokkaido— founded during a period of colonization during the Meiji period. Therefore, it is often said that Eiheiji is a head temple only in the sense that it is "head of all Sōtō dharma lineages.

In an advice to western practitioners, Kojun Kishigami Osho, a dharma heir of Kodo Sawaki, writes:

Rinzai
The Rinzai-school has 14 main-temples, to which subsidiary temples are attached. The 14 branches of Rinzai, by head temple, are:

 Daitoku-ji (founded by Shūhō Myōchō)
 Eigen-ji
 Engaku-ji
 Hōkō-ji
 Kenchō-ji
 Kennin-ji
 Kōgaku-ji
 Kokutai-ji
 Myōshin-ji (founded in 1342 by Kanzan Egen Zenji)
 Nanzen-ji (founded by Musō Soseki)
 Shōkoku-ji
 Tenryū-ji (founded by Musō Soseki)
 Tōfuku-ji (founded by Enni Ben'en, 1202–1280)

Sometimes a 15th is included:
 Manpuku-ji, properly part of Ōbaku instead

Dharma transmission

In the western understanding, dharma transmission is primarily the affirmation of awakening by a teacher. But is also part of the continuation and maintenance of Zen-institutions.

Function of Dharma Transmission

Esoteric and exoteric transmission
According to Borup the emphasis on 'mind to mind transmission' is a form of esoteric transmission, in which "the tradition and the enlightened mind is transmitted face to face". Metaphorically this can be described as the transmission from a flame from one candle to another candle, or the transmission from one vein to another.

Exoteric transmission requires "direct access to the teaching through a personal discovery of one's self. This type of transmission and identification is symbolized by the discovery of a shining lantern, or a mirror."

This polarity is recognizable in the emphasis that the Zen-tradition puts on maintaining the correct Dharma transmission, while simultaneously stressing seeing into one's nature. Seeing one's nature gives an autonomous confirmation of Zen's ultimate truth, which may conflict with the need to maintain institutions and traditions.

Family structure
According to Bodiford, "Zen is the predominant form of Buddhism because of dharma transmission":

Bodiford distinguishes seven dimension which are discernible in both family relationships and in dharma lineages:
 Ancestral dimension: "Ancestors (so) constitute a fundamental source of power". Performing rituals in honour of the ancestors keeps them in high regard "among the living".
 Biological dimension: the dharma lineage creates (spiritual) offspring, just as the family creates new life.
 Linguistic dimension: dharma heirs receive new names, which reflect their tie to the dharma 'family'.
 Ritual dimension: rituals confirm the family relationships. One's teacher is honored in rituals, as are deceised teachers.
 Legal dimension: teachers have the obligation to discipline their students, just as students have the obligation to obey their teachers.
 Institutional and financial dimension: dharma heirs have an obligation to support their home temple, both financially and ritually.
 Temporal dimension: long-term relationships foster the previous dimensions.

The family-model is easier recognized when East Asian languages are being used, because the same terminology is used to describe both earthly and spiritual family relations.

Contemporary use of Dharma transmission
In Soto, dharma transmission establishes a lifelong relation between teacher and student. To qualify as a Zen priest, further training is required.

In Rinzai, the most common form of transmission is the acknowledgement that one has stayed in the monastery for a certain amount of time, and may later become a temple priest. The common transmission does not include inka shōmei, which is being used for the transmission of the "true lineage" of the masters (shike) of the training halls. Training halls are temples which are authorised for further training after being qualified as a temple priest. There are only about fifty to a hundred of such inka shōmei-bearers in Japan.

Although the formal transmission of the dharma-lineage, from Shakyamuni Buddha to the present day, is preserved in this way, it is also seen as problematical in contemporary Zen.

Self-awakening

The Zen tradition has always stressed the importance of formal Dharma transmission, but there are indeed well known examples of Mushi dokugo, self-awakening, such as Nōnin, Jinul and Suzuki Shōsan who attained awakening on their own, though all of them were familiair with the Zen-teachings.

Zen Universities

Both Soto and Rinzai have educational institutions, such as Komazawa University and Hanazono University, which stand in strong competition. Several Zen-teachers known in the west have studied there, such as Shohaku Okumura and Keido Fukushima. The Kyoto University was the centre of activities for the Kyoto School, to which belong Keiji Nishitani and Masao Abe.

Organization of Western Zen
Western Zen is mainly a lay-movement, though grounded in formal lineages. Its Japanese background is in mainly lay-oriented new religious movements, especially the Sanbo Kyodan. Though a number of zen-buddhist monasteries exist in the western world, most practice takes place in Zen centers throughout the western world.

Koné sees three issues in the emerging western Zen tradition: sustainability, legitimacy, and authority.
 Sustainability: Zen groups and organizations need income to survive. "Covert centers" offer meditation courses, for which they charge a fee. These groups "often experience a high turnover, with a core of long-time practitioners". "Residential centers" have a limited number of long term residents, with a high commitment, who serve a larger lay community. Income is generated by donations. Publicity is low-key, since a rapid growth would threaten the continuity.
 Legitimacy: Zen groups need legitimacy, which is "social recognition and acceptance". The primary means for this is the "master-disciple relationship" and the "central reference to transmission". Various attitudes toward the tradition are possible: emulating the traditions, adaptation of the tradition, a critical stance toward the tradition, and borrowing from the tradition.
 Authority: two patterns are discernable, namely spiritual achievement and "spiritual friendship", and "spiritual hierarchy". Smaller groups tend toward egalitarity and spiritual friendship, where-as larger groups tend toward more hierarchical organisation.

A recurrent issue has been the reliance on charismatic authority and the resulting teacher scandals. Sandra Bell has analysed the scandals at Vajradhatu and the San Francisco Zen Center and concluded that these kinds of scandals are

Robert Sharf also mentions charisma from which institutional power is derived, and the need to balance charismatic authority with institutional authority. Elaborate analyses of these scandals are made by Stuart Lachs, who mentions the uncritical acceptance of religious narratives, such as lineages and dharma transmission, which aid in giving uncritical charismatic powers to teachers and leaders.

The scandals eventually lead to rules of conduct by the American Zen Teachers Association, and the reorganising of Zen Centers, to spread the management of those centers over a wider group of people and diminish the role of charismatic authority. Another affect was the split in various Zen organisations, such as Robert Aitken leaving the Sanbo Kyodan, and Joko Beck leaving the White Plum Sangha.

See also
 List of Buddhists
 Outline of Buddhism
 Timeline of Buddhism
 Chinese Chan

Notes

References

Book references

Web references

Sources

Further reading

External links

 thezensite
 Zen Buddhism WWW Virtual Library
 Chart of (Asian) Zen schools
 Sweeping Zen: Who's who in Zen
 Glossary of Japanese Zen terms

Zen